Moseøya Bird Sanctuary is a bird reserve at Svalbard, Norway, established in 1973. It includes Moseøya, south of Danes Island, part of Albert I Land. The protected area covers a total area of around 1,400,000 square metres.

References

Bird sanctuaries in Svalbard
Protected areas established in 1973
1973 establishments in Norway